The allowed cell rate is the rate in cells per second at which a source device may send data in ATM networks. It is bounded by the minimum cell rate and the peak cell rate.

References 

ITU-T recommendations
Temporal rates